Issuf Vladlen Sanon (born October 30, 1999), also spelled Yusuf Sanon, is a Ukrainian professional basketball player for Prometey of the Latvian-Estonian Basketball League and EuroCup. Standing , the combo guard has experience with the Ukraine under-18 national team. He began his career with the Ukrainian club Dnipro, and was one of the top players on its reserve team.

Early life
Sanon was born and raised in Donetsk, Ukraine. His father, a native of Ouagadougou, Burkina Faso, met Issuf's mother while the two were studying in Ukraine. Sanon began playing basketball at age 7, following his older brother into the sport. In 2014, he competed with the Falcons in the Donetsk School Basketball League, under head coach Anna Kapralova.

Professional career

Dnipro (2016–2018)
Sanon made his professional debut for Dnipro on October 2, 2016, scoring two points in two minutes against BIPA Odessa, in the top-tier level league in Ukraine, the Ukrainian Basketball SuperLeague. In his first season with the team, he primarily competed for the club's reserve team, Dnipro-2 in the Ukrainian Higher League, the second-tier level professional league in the country. On January 17, 2017, he earned Player of the Week honors from the website Eurobasket.com, after recording a double-double of 22 points and 11 rebounds, in a January 14 game, for Dnipro-2 to defeat Kremen-2. He completed the season for Dnipro-2 averaging 16.8 points, 6.4 rebounds, 3.3 assists, and 3.3 steals per game, in the second division Higher League.

In the 2017–18 season, Sanon saw more playing time for the Dnipro senior team and increased success on the reserve team. His season debut came on September 27, 2017, against Demir İnşaat Büyükçekmece in FIBA Europe Cup's 2017–18 qualification rounds, playing 56 seconds and recording no statistics. On October 15, 2017, with second division Dnipro-2, Sanon recorded 33 points, four rebounds, and eight assists, en route to Eurobasket.com Higher League Player of the Week accolades. He scored a career-high 11 points off the bench, on December 1, 2017, to help defeat Cherkaski Mavpy, in the first division SuperLeague. In his 2017–18 stint with Dnipro, he averaged 2.4 points, 1.2 assists, and 0.8 steals in 9.6 minutes per game, in 13 games played in the Ukrainian top division Super League. In addition, in 5 games played, he averaged a team-best 24.6 points, 4.6 rebounds, 3.8 assists, and 3.4 steals per game, in the Ukrainian second division Higher League.

Olimpija (2018–2019)
On January 13, 2018, Sanon signed a four-year contract with Petrol Olimpija of the Premier A Slovenian Basketball League (SKL). He debuted for his new team on January 21, 2018, recording only one steal in eight minutes in an ABA League loss to Budućnost Voli Podgorica. On January 28, Sanon scored 11 points and grabbed five rebounds against Šenčur GGD, in a Slovenian SKL game. He notched a career-high 23 points vs. Helios Suns Domžale, in a Slovenian SKL game on February 13, shooting 4-of-7 from the three-point line. On July 27, 2020, he parted ways with Olimpija.

Return to Dnipro (2019–2022)
On August 22, 2019, Dnipro announced it had signed Sanon for the 2019–20 season. On July, 2020 he re-signed with the team.

Prometey (2022–present)
On June 24, 2022, he has signed with Prometey of the Latvian-Estonian Basketball League.

NBA draft rights
On April 4, 2018, Sanon announced his intentions to enter the 2018 NBA draft, where ESPN projected him to be a "strong draft-and-stash candidate." By the June 11 international deadline, Sanon was one of 11 truly international prospects to remain in the 2018 NBA draft. He was eventually picked by the Washington Wizards (second round, 44th overall). Sanon played for the Wizards during the NBA Summer League, but then returned to Slovenia to develop and gain more experience.

On February 6, 2020, Sanon's draft rights were traded to the New York Knicks. On November 27, 2020, Sanon's draft rights were traded to the Houston Rockets.

National team career
Sanon was unable to compete for the Ukraine under-16 basketball team in 2015, due to an appendix injury. An ankle injury, as well as a lack of official documentation, also prevented him from joining. He made his junior national team debut for Ukraine, at the 2017 FIBA Europe Under-18 Championship, in Slovakia. In seven games played, in a span of just over a week, he averaged 19.3 points, 6.1 rebounds, 2.7 assists, and 3.4 steals per game, leading his team to a 12th place finish at the tournament. Sanon was named All-European Championships U18 Honorable Mention by the basketball website Eurobasket.com. Entering the event as a little-known prospect, even in his home country, his unexpected success in Slovenia catapulted him into NBA draft consideration. He was subsequently considered a top-10 prospect at the event, according to ESPN.

Personal life
Sanon is a fan of the Denver Nuggets of the National Basketball Association (NBA) and admired Emmanuel Mudiay during his stint with the team. With Olimpija, he takes English classes up to four times each week, watching the show Prison Break to better pick up the language.

References

External links
 Issuf Sanon at Eurobasket.com
 Issuf Sanon at fiba.com

1999 births
Living people
ABA League players
BC Dnipro players
BC Prometey players
Ukrainian expatriate basketball people in Lithuania
KK Olimpija players
Point guards
Shooting guards
Sportspeople from Donetsk
Sportspeople of Burkinabé descent
Ukrainian expatriate basketball people in Slovenia
Ukrainian men's basketball players
Ukrainian people of Burkinabé descent
Washington Wizards draft picks